The Zagreb Botanical Garden is a botanical garden located in downtown Zagreb, Croatia. Founded in 1889 by Antun Heinz, Professor of the University of Zagreb, and opened to public in 1891, it is part of the Faculty of Science. It is home to over 10,000 plant species from around the world, including 1,800 exotic ones. It has large ponds for aquatic plants. Some of Slava Raškaj's most notable works were painted by the garden ponds.

References

External links

 

Botanical gardens in Croatia
University of Zagreb
1889 establishments in Austria-Hungary
Tourist attractions in Zagreb
Donji grad, Zagreb